Gariber Sansar is a 1996 Bengali film directed by Delwar Jahan Jhantu and produced by Bandhan Banichitra. The music of the film was composed by Anwar Jahan Nantu.

Cast
Shabana
 Jashim
Bapparaj
Aruna Biswas
Danny Sidak

Music

References

External links

 Gariber Sansar on YouTube

1996 drama films
1996 films
Bengali-language Bangladeshi films
1990s Bengali-language films
Films scored by Anwar Jahan Nantu
Bangladeshi drama films